Ljubinci may refer to:
 Ljubinci, Rankovce, North Macedonia
 Ljubinci (Aleksandrovac), Serbia